The Deadly Tower of Monsters is an action-adventure game developed by ACE Team and published by Atlus USA for Microsoft Windows and PlayStation 4 in January 2016. The game is a metafictional parody of science fiction midnight B movie from its golden age, with caricatural action heroes.

Gameplay 

The Deadly Tower of Monsters mixes beat 'em up and twin-stick shooter elements, with a fixed camera system seen from a top-down perspective. The main focus during player's gameplay is one long, continuous climb up the outside of the titular tower. A jetpack can be used to reach high areas.

There is also a 4-player cooperative and hard mode, released on 14 March 2016, and survival mode, released on 4 October the same year – both exclusively to Windows version.

Plot 
The Deadly Tower of Monsters follows three actors in the in-game space opera movie of the same name: Jonathan Digby who stars as Dick Starspeed – an astronaut hero who crash-lands his spaceship on the outlandish planet Gravoria, ruled by a tyrannical Emperor; Stacy Sharp as Scarlet Nova – daughter of the planet's evil Emperor; and The Robot as Robot – a co-pilot and Starspeed's trusty sidekick.

The game's framing device is that of an early 1970s B movie The Deadly Tower of Monsters recently released on DVD, with the director's commentary of its in-universe director Dan Smith, serving as a combination of tutorial and meta-commentary on the game, providing an explanation as to why many default elements of shooters would be in what is ostensibly a film (the player being required to break boxes to obtain items, for example, is taken as the lead actor ad-libbing on Smith's advice to make sure every moment was somewhat exciting).

Development 
The Deadly Tower of Monsters was announced on 12 June 2015. According to Carlos Bordeu, one of the ACE Team founders, it was initially planned as a dungeon crawler set in a vertical labyrinth, with the "more generic fantasy". Game's concept was changed because the team "wanted to do something that was completely different", as he stated. The inspiration came from the 1950s and 1960s science fiction films, including the Godzilla franchise, Forbidden Planet, and Plan 9 from Outer Space; as well as TV series Flash Gordon and Lost in Space from the same era. Scarlet Nova character was modeled after Jane Fonda's sexy heroine Barbarella, from the 1968 movie of the same name. Dan Smith's exaggerated personality, on the other hand, was partly based on the Mystery Science Theater 3000 – a science fiction comedy series created by Joel Hodgson, which ACE Team loved; and Ed Wood, an American cult filmmaker. Some enemies were animated by using the stop motion and rotoscoping technique.

The Deadly Tower of Monsters trailer was published on 2 December 2015, followed by the game's release on 19 January 2016.

Reception 

The Deadly Tower of Monsters received above-average reviews on both platforms according to the review aggregation website Metacritic. Destructoid said, "The Deadly Tower of Monsters is a fleeting experience, but one that no B-movie fan should go without." PlayStation LifeStyle said, "Just like the movies it tries to emulate, the game is so bad with its special effects, dialogue, and set-pieces that it's rather good." Hardcore Gamer said, "Minor issues aside, The Deadly Tower of Monsters is a pleasant surprise indeed and a particularly impressive budget action game showcasing a lot of creativity."

References

External links 
 
 

2016 video games
ACE Team games
Action-adventure games
Apes in popular culture
Atlus games
Cooperative video games
Dinosaurs in video games
Fiction about filmmaking
Fiction about invisibility
Fiction about monsters
Fictional towers
Metafictional video games
Multiplayer and single-player video games
Mutants in fiction
Parody video games
PlayStation 4 games
PlayStation Network games
Retrofuturistic video games
Satirical video games
Science fiction comedy
Self-reflexive video games
Space opera video games
Top-down video games
Unreal Engine games
Video games about extraterrestrial life
Video games based on films
Video games developed in Chile
Video games set in the 1970s
Video games set on fictional islands
Video games set on fictional planets
Windows games